This is a list of songs that reached number one on the German Media Control Top100 Singles Chart in 1961.

See also
List of number-one hits (Germany)

References
 Ehnert, Günter (1999). HIT BILANZ Deutsche Chart Singles 1956-1980. 
 German Singles Chart archives from 1956
 Media Control Chart archives from 1960

1961 in Germany
1961 record charts
1961